WWF WrestleMania is a game developed by Twilight and published by Ocean Software in 1991 for the Amiga, Amstrad CPC, Atari ST, Commodore 64, ZX Spectrum, and DOS. Named after the World Wrestling Federation's (WWF) annual pay-per-view event WrestleMania, it was the first WWF licensed game available for these computers which were still dominant in Europe. It was followed on most of these computers by 1992's WWF European Rampage Tour.

In February 1993, the Spectrum and Amstrad CPC versions were released as part of the Super Fighter compilation with Pit-Fighter and Final Fight.

Visually, the game resembles the arcade game WWF Superstars, and it plays somewhat similarly as well.

Gameplay

The player can choose from either Hulk Hogan, The Ultimate Warrior, or The British Bulldog and must defeat five opponents to become the WWF World Heavyweight Champion. The opponents are, in order, Mr. Perfect, The Warlord, "Million Dollar Man" Ted DiBiase, The Mountie, and Sgt. Slaughter. Before each match, the opponent will taunt the player's wrestler with a comment, and the player will then be able to choose from several replies in a nod to the WWF house style at the time.

Each wrestler is able to perform basic punches and kicks as well as a range of more advanced moves such as dropkicking, clotheslining, and one signature grapple maneuver which is performed by "waggling the joystick". In addition, there is a chair outside the ring which can be used as a weapon. Matches have a five-minute time limit, and a time limit draw or count-out will have the same effect as losing a match. The player has a total of four credits.

The game also features a practice mode in which the player faces a prone opponent. Another player can also control the second wrestler, but it will always be Mr. Perfect.

Reception

The game was well received. Crash said that "Ocean have captured the atmosphere of the sport perfectly." Sinclair User liked the game, but criticized the lack of alternate difficulty options. Your Sinclair said "The graphics in WWF are really slick", and also praised the multiplayer option, which they described as "the best two-player game that's been seen on any Speccy fighting game".

See also

List of licensed professional wrestling video games
List of fighting games

References

External links

WWF WrestleMania at Hall of Light Amiga database

1991 video games
Amiga games
Amstrad CPC games
Atari ST games
Commodore 64 games
DOS games
Ocean Software games
WrestleMania video games
WWE video games
ZX Spectrum games
Multiplayer and single-player video games
Professional wrestling games
Video games developed in the United Kingdom
Twilight (company) games